Frederick Shaw (1824 - 19 March 1902) was a member of the Queensland Legislative Assembly.

Biography
Shaw was born in Pontefract, Yorkshire, the son of Isaac Shaw and his wife Ann. He was educated in Yorkshire and by 1861 was in Australia and working as an agent in Dalby for Cobb and Co. Around 1871 he was growing sugar in the Albert region and then was the General Manager for Queensland of Cobb and Co. in 1876. He was a Director of the City and Suburban Building Society in 1892.

He was married to Matilda Thompson and together had three sons and three daughters. Shaw died at Emu Park on 19 March 1902 and his body was sent to Rockhampton by train the next morning for his burial at the South Rockhampton Cemetery.

Public career
Shaw won the seat of Logan in the Queensland Legislative Assembly in 1875 following the resignation of Adam Black who it was said to not like parliamentary life. Shaw himself resigned from the parliament in 1876.

References

Members of the Queensland Legislative Assembly
1824 births
1902 deaths
19th-century Australian politicians